Damir Džumhur was the defending champion, but he lost in the second round to Maxime Hamou.

Albert Ramos-Viñolas won the title, defeating Alessandro Giannessi in the final, 6–2, 6–4.

Seeds

Draw

Finals

Top half

Bottom half

References
 Main Draw
 Qualifying Draw

San Benedetto Tennis Cup - Singles
2015 Singles